Somlata Acharyya Chowdhury is an Indian Bengali singer. She rose to fame with the release of 'Tumi Asbe Bole' & 'Jagarane Jay Bibhabaree' from the Bengali film Ranjana Ami Ar Ashbona in 2011. She has been a prominent singer in Bengali films since 2007. Besides films, she also worked for several solo albums with her band Somlata & the Aces. Apart from being a singer, she works as a guest lecturer of Psychology in Asutosh College, Kolkata.

Personal life 
On 23 November 2012, she married Akash Roy.

Discography

Solo albums and singles
Chupkatha (2009)
Aami Achhi Er Majhe (2014)
Mor Bhabonare (2016)
Aabdaar (Single) (2017)
kaa karoon Sajni (2018)
Yaad Piya Ki aye (2018)
Ude jete Chaye (2019)
Naina Morey (2019)
Protisruti (2019)
Khuje Paabe Na Amake (2019)

Filmography
Somlata sang her first playback for the crossover film Perfect Woman in 2007.

Live performances 
Somlata performs in live shows with her band Somlata and The Aces. They have performed in various live concerts all over India, and also in Bangladesh, United States Of America, United Arab Emirates, Hong Kong, Kuwait, etc. Their live sound can be described as a platter of Indian Semi Classical, Pop Rock, Modern Film Songs, Folk Fusion and Sufi. The band is particularly popular among the youth, and performs at many campus festivals, corporate events, televised shows, public concerts, government events and abroad shows.

The current band lineup is:

Somlata Acharyya Chowdhury: Vocals

Arnab Roy: Guitars

Abhishek Bhattacharya: Bass Guitars

Tushar Banerjee: Drums & Percussions

Somlata And The Aces is managed by EventMas

Awards 
Best Discovery Award at ETV Dada na Didi: Gaaner Big Fight
Agami Diner Star at Star Jalsha Entertainment Awards (2010)
Anandalok Special Jury Award
Etv Bangla Best playback (female)
Tele Cine Awards for Best Female Singer
Mirchi Music Awards Bangla for Best Female Singer 2017
Radio Mirchi best Film " Bojhena Shey Bojhena "
Radio Mirchi best Film " Bibaho Diaries "
Radio Mirchi best female singer 
Times Power Women 2018
Times Style Icon 2019
Sangeet Shomman 2019, West Bengal Govt.

References

External links 
 
Youtube Channel
Somlata Facebook Page
Band Facebook Page

Bengali-language singers
Bengali singers
Bengali Hindus
Academic staff of the University of Calcutta
1985 births
Living people
Singers from Kolkata